Dishoom is a 2016 Indian Hindi-language buddy cop action comedy film directed by Rohit Dhawan and produced by Sajid Nadiadwala. It stars John Abraham, Varun Dhawan, Jacqueline Fernandez, Akshaye Khanna and Saqib Saleem and features Parineeti Chopra, Akshay Kumar and Nargis Fakhri in special appearances. The film revolves around two cops, who are appointed to rescue a kidnapped Indian cricketer from a Pakistani cricket bookie.

Dishoom was released theatrically worldwide on 29 July 2016. Some scenes of the movie are inspired from the Hollywood film, The Last Boy Scout. It was an moderately commercially successful at the box office, earning 119 crore worldwide.

Plot 
During a cricket tournament in the Middle East, 48 hours prior to the final match between India and Pakistan, India's top cricketer Viraj Sharma goes missing. Indian authorities get a video tape of an unknown man claiming to have abducted Viraj till the India vs Pakistan cricket match two days later and warning them not to cancel the match. Attempting to avoid media outrage, Gayatri Shubha Mishra, the External Affairs Minister of India, sends special task force officer Kabir Shergill IPS to U.A.E for a 36-hour manhunt. After being received by and getting into a semi-scuffle with a local officer, Saeed Naqvi, Kabir, who is a no-nonsense cop, bumps into a rookie Indo-Emirati police officer Junaid Ansari, who has never been able to solve a case but has a good knowledge of the town which he acquired during his first incomplete case of finding a dog named Bradman. Both Kabir and Junaid start their investigation with a CCTV footage of Viraj's hotel and find out that on the night of his disappearance, Viraj went out with a local girl, Samira Dalal. On confronting her, they learn that she took Viraj to a friend's birthday party but he left soon. 

Later, they roam around the town to meet a local goon nicknamed Khabri Chacha, who directs them to Sameer Gazi, the city's biggest party animal who met Viraj in the same party, but are still unable to lay hands on any clue. Finally, the duo gets a breakthrough by tracking down Viraj's cellphone from the apartment of a pick-pocketer, Ishika, who claims to have stolen the cell phone from a stranger, the previous night, in a supermarket. During this time, Junaid finally finds Bradman and vows to never lose track of him, tying a tracker band around his neck, containing a hidden camera. The duo also manages to capture the person in the video, but discovers that he is just a struggling actor being used as the face in the video by the real kidnapper. However, Junaid is shocked when the actor recognizes the "stranger" Ishika had mentioned as the fugitive who conducted his audition, and rubs a sketch clue of evidence out to Kabir, who asks Saeed, Junaid's superior, to identify the stranger. Meanwhile, it is revealed that the real kidnapper is a cricket bookie Wagah, who along with his assistant Altaf, the stranger, has abducted Viraj and offered him 300 million rupees to under play in the final. 

They finally close the deal for 500 million, but when the deal didn't work out and Viraj closeted onto them, bluffing an imposterly Wagah into believing he would underplay, they kidnap him permanently till the final match is played. Kabir, a suspended-from-duty Junaid and Ishika go to an underground Arabian club in Altaf's native state Abuddin, full of goons and guns, where Ishika helps Kabir and Junaid by distracting the goons and later Kabir rescues her from them. During the journey, Junaid reveals to Ishika that Kabir suffered from cancer and was cheated by his girlfriend for the same and has lost his smile ever since. Hearing this, Ishika warms up to Kabir, clicking and sending photos of both together while he is still asleep, to his recently turned ex-girlfriend Alishka, with whom he had a breakup. Kabir spots Altaf and both try to chase him down but before they could succeed, a sniper kills Altaf. Wagah calls and confesses to Kabir that he got him killed and they should stop searching for Viraj. Wagah confronts Viraj, threatens to kill his family, shoots both a Mumbai-based partner and his own manager, and asks his wife to leave with their son, finally stranded, with only Bradman, revealed to be their family dog, by his side. 

On returning to Abu Dhabi, Kabir and Junaid are taken off the case and Kabir ordered to fly back to India. Seeing Kabir walk towards the airport, Ishika goes soft and confesses her feelings for Kabir to Junaid. At the 11th hour, Junaid gets a clue of Viraj's whereabout through the camera on Bradman's neck band, as Wagah has hidden him in a yacht near the team's hotel. Both reach the location only to discover that Wagah has fled leaving behind Viraj tied with a time bomb after Wagah realised that Bradman carried a GPS tracker. With only minutes left for the bomb to blast, Kabir negotiates with Wagah to stop the bomb in return of 5 billion rupees from the Indian Government. Wagah takes the money but refuses to stop the bomb. After witnessing the blast from a distance, Wagah walks into the cricket stadium expecting the match to begin without Viraj, but to his shock, Viraj is alive and walks into the ground all ready to play as it is revealed that Kabir and Junaid helped Viraj to get out of the jacket by dislocating his shoulder and all three had jumped into water just before the blast. After seeing his plan failed, Wagah tries to escape only to be apprehended by the duo. Kabir, who now has feelings for Ishika, returns to India along with her, while Junaid, who regains his duty, gets a marriage proposal from an Indian girl, Muskaan and also flies to India to meet her.

Cast 
 John Abraham as Kabir "K" Shergill, an Indian STF officer
 Varun Dhawan as Junaid "J" Ansari, an Indo-Emirati rookie and Kabir's own subordinate
 Jacqueline Fernandez as Meera "Ishika" Behl alias Parvati / Pakeezah, a pick-pocketer who ends up stealing Viraj's phone
 Akshaye Khanna as Rahul "Wagah" Kabiraj, a bookie who targets and kidnaps Viraj
 Saqib Saleem as Viraj Sharma, a top Indian batsman
 Rashmi Nigam as Wagah's wife
 Tarun Khanna as Inspector Saeed Naqvi, a local officer and Kabir's tentative partner who gets replaced by Junaid
 Rahul Dev as Altaaf Dad, Wagah's protege and assistant
 Mir Sarwar as Hadeed, a weapons trader
 Mansoor as Captain Yusuf Al-Dami, Abu Dhabi Police Chief
 Pawan Chopra as Mishkat Sudhir, BCCI Chief
 Vijay Raaz as Mushtaq Rizvi / Khabri Chacha, a local goon in Abu Dhabi who directs Kabir and Junaid to Sameer
 Manu Malik as Shree, the person in the lift
 Sahil Phull as Customs Officer Vishal Sinha, Kabir's former colleague who deceives him by having an affair with Alishka
 Anupriya Goenka as Alishka Iyer, Kabir's girlfriend with whom he breaks up after having an affair with Vishal
 Jatin Gaur as Rashid Alvi Farooq, a tech-expert in Abu Dhabi Police
 Faisal Rashid as a struggling actor who was forced to pose as a fanatical Pakistan supporter
 Mona Ambegaonkar as Gayatri Shubha Mishra, the External Affairs Minister of India
 Akash Dhar as Wagah's henchman
 Mohinder Amarnath as Dhananjay Sadanand, Viraj's coach
 Atul Wassan as himself
 Rameez Raja as himself

Special appearance
 Akshay Kumar as Sameer Gazi, a party animal and the city's biggest one who meets Viraj in a party
 Parineeti Chopra as Muskaan Raza Qureshi, a prospective bride who wishes to meet Junaid and becomes his girlfriend 
 Nargis Fakhri as Samira Dalal, a local socialite who takes Viraj to a friend's birthday party
 Satish Kaushik in a voiceover as Aarif Raza Qureshi, Muskaan's father

Production

Filming 
The first schedule of the film started on June 27, 2015 at Mehboob Studio. Varun Dhawan and Jacqueline Fernandez joined the set on 4 July 2015. Abu Dhabi was also a filming location; the production crew chose Abu Dhabi, as they would benefit from the Emirate's 30% rebate scheme.
some of the movie scenes copied from The Last Boy Scout

Critical response
On the review aggregation website Rotten Tomatoes, the film has a rating of 56%, based on 9 reviews, with an average rating of 5.1/10.

Soundtrack 

The music for Dishoom is composed by Pritam while lyrics have been penned by Kumaar and Mayur Puri, with Ashish Pandit as a special guest. The music rights have been acquired by  T-Series. The full music album was released on 15 July 2016.

References

External links 
 

2010s Hindi-language films
2010s action adventure films
2010s spy comedy films
2016 action comedy films
2016 masala films
2016 films
Indian spy comedy films
Films featuring songs by Pritam
Films about cricket in India
Indian action adventure films
Films about the Research and Analysis Wing
Films shot in Abu Dhabi
Indian action comedy films
2016 comedy films